Voyage to the Bottom of the Sea is a 1961 American science fiction disaster film, produced and directed by Irwin Allen, and starring Walter Pidgeon and Robert Sterling. The supporting cast includes Peter Lorre, Joan Fontaine, Barbara Eden, Michael Ansara, and Frankie Avalon. The film's storyline was written by Irwin Allen and Charles Bennett. The opening title credits theme song was sung by Avalon. The film was distributed by 20th Century Fox.

Plot
The new, state-of-the-art nuclear submarine, Seaview, is on diving trials in the Arctic Ocean. Seaview is designed and built by scientist and engineering genius Admiral Harriman Nelson (USN-Ret). Captain Lee Crane  is the submarine's Commanding Officer. One of the on-board observers is Dr. Susan Hiller, studying crew-related stress. The mission includes being out of radio contact for 96 hours while under the Arctic ice cap. The polar ice suddenly begins to crack and melt, with boulder-size pieces sinking into the ocean around the submerged submarine (no explanation is given as to why the ice sinks). Surfacing, they discover the sky is on fire. After rescuing scientist Miguel Alvarez and his dog at Ice Floe Delta, Seaview receives a radio message from Mission Director Inspector Bergan at the Bureau of Marine Exploration. He reports that a meteor shower has pierced the Van Allen radiation belt, causing it to catch on fire, resulting in a deadly increase in the global temperature. Nelson's on-board friend and scientist, retired Commodore Lucius Emery, concurs it is possible.

The President summons Admiral Nelson to a UN Emergency Scientific meeting. Nelson and Commodore Emery have devised a plan to end the catastrophe. Seaview arrives in New York Harbor two days later. Nelson informs the UN that, according to their calculations, if the increasing temperature is not stopped, it will become irreversible and the Earth will die in about three weeks. The Admiral and the Commander propose extinguishing the fire by launching a nuclear missile at the burning belt from the Mariana Islands. A nuclear explosion should overwhelm and extinguish the flames, "amputating" the belt from the Earth. Seaview has the capability of firing the missile. The chief scientist and head delegate, Vienna's Emilio Zucco rejects the Admiral's plan as too risky. He believes the composition of the belt's gasses will cause the fire to soon burn itself out when reaching 173 degrees. Nelson disagrees with Zucco's theory, claiming that his estimated burn-out point is incorrect. Nelson and Emery's plan is rejected. The Admiral and the Commodore quickly leave the proceedings intending to get authorization directly from the President himself.

The Seaview races to reach the optimal firing position above the Pacific Ocean's Marianas trench in time for the needed angle of trajectory. Nelson and Crane attempt tapping the Rio-to-London telephone cable in an attempt to reach the President. During the cable tapping attempt, Crane and Alvarez battle a giant squid. They can only tap into the London cable, and Nelson learns there has been no contact with the U.S. for 35 hours.

An unsuccessful attempt on the Admiral's life indicates a saboteur is aboard. The rescued scientist, Miguel Alvarez, a religious zealot regarding the catastrophe, is the suspected saboteur. Dr. Hiller, who privately supports Dr Zucco's plan, is another suspect.

Other obstacles present themselves. The Seaview's main generator is sabotaged by a crew member who lost his mind, forcing Nelson to order Crane to proceed while repairs are made despite the risk of proceeding without power for the sonar and radar. As a result, the sub narrowly escapes a minefield left over from World War II. The crew are near-mutiny, to the point that when the Seaview encounters a motor ship whose crew is dead, Captain Crane and the Admiral allow any crew members who wish to leave rather than continue the mission to leave the sub and sail the derelict home.

Crane begins doubting the Admiral's tactics and reasoning.  A hostile, unidentified submarine pursues them, diving deep into the Mariana Trench, exceeding its crush depth; the sub implodes before it can destroy Seaview.

The saboteur has shut down the sub's power. Crane encounters Dr Hiller, the saboteur, atop the shark tank, as she exits the restricted nuclear reactor core. Her radiation detector badge has turned red, showing she has been exposed to a fatal dose. When asked why, she says to prevent the sub from reaching its target. Suddenly an explosion rocks the sub, throwing Dr. Hiller into the shark tank. She is killed by the sharks.

Seaview reaches the Mariana Islands in time to carry out the Admiral's plan. He learns that temperatures are rising faster than projected, proving Zucco's theory is incorrect. Alvarez, believing it is God's will for the Earth to be destroyed, attempts to sabotage the mission by threatening to explode a bomb. The nuclear missile is launched toward the belt by Captain Crane, who launches the nuclear missile from outside the sub before Alvarez is aware. It explodes in the Van Allen Belt as intended, driving the burning flames away from the Earth and saving humanity.

As the sky returns to its normal blue color, Seaview turns for home, her mission completed.

Cast
 Walter Pidgeon as Admiral Harriman Nelson
 Joan Fontaine as Dr. Susan Hiller
 Barbara Eden as Lieutenant (JG) Cathy Connors
 Peter Lorre as Commodore Lucius Emery
 Robert Sterling as Captain Lee Crane
 Michael Ansara as Miguel Alvarez
 Frankie Avalon as Lieutenant (JG) Danny Romano
 Regis Toomey as Dr. Jamieson
 John Litel as Vice-Admiral B.J. Crawford
 Howard McNear as Congressman Llewellyn Parker
 Henry Daniell as Dr. Emilio Zucco
 Robert Easton as 'Sparks'
 Mark Slade as Seaman Jimmy 'Red' Smith
 Charles Tannen as CPO Gleason
 Del Monroe as Seaman Kowski

Historical and technical background

The name of the film is an inversion of a phrase in common use at the time, concerning the exploration of the Arctic Ocean by nuclear submarines, namely, "a voyage to the top of the world".

From August 1, 1958, through August 5, 1958,  (the first nuclear-powered submarine), under the command of Commander (later Captain) William R. Anderson, steamed under the Arctic ice cap to make the first crossing from the Pacific to the Atlantic via the North Pole. On August 3, 1958, she became the first vessel to reach the North Pole.

For this accomplishment, Nautilus and her crew were awarded the Presidential Unit Citation, the first Presidential Unit Citation awarded in peacetime. The citation began with the words, "For outstanding achievement in completing the first voyage in history across the top of the world, by cruising under the Arctic ice cap from the Bering Strait to the Greenland Sea".

Nautilus 90 North (1959, with Clay Blair) was the first book Anderson wrote about the Arctic missions of USS Nautilus. It was named for the radio message he sent to the Chief of Naval Operations to announce that Nautilus had reached the pole. His second book about these missions, The Ice Diaries: The Untold Story of the Cold War's Most Daring Mission (with Don Keith), was completed shortly before Anderson's death. This second book includes many previously classified details.

On March 17, 1959, the nuclear submarine , under the command of Commander (later Vice Admiral) James F. Calvert, became the first submarine to surface at the North Pole. While there, her crew scattered the ashes of Arctic explorer Sir Hubert Wilkins. Calvert wrote the book Surface at the Pole about this and the other Arctic missions of USS Skate.

The film Voyage to the Bottom of the Sea begins with Seaview in the Arctic for the final phase of her sea trials, including a dive under the ice cap.

Two milestones in underwater exploration were achieved in 1960, the year before Voyage to the Bottom of the Sea was released. On January 23, 1960, Jacques Piccard and Lieutenant Don Walsh (USN), in the bathyscaphe Trieste, made the first descent to the bottom of the Challenger Deep. The Challenger Deep is the deepest surveyed spot in the world's oceans, and is located in the Mariana Trench, southwest of Guam. From February 16, 1960, to May 10, 1960, the submarine , under the command of Captain Edward L. Beach, Jr., made the first submerged circumnavigation of the world. Triton observed and photographed Guam extensively through her periscope during this mission, without being detected by the U.S. Navy on Guam.

In the film, Seaview fires a missile from a position northwest of Guam to extinguish the "sky fire".

At the time that Voyage to the Bottom of the Sea was made, the Van Allen radiation belts had only recently been discovered, and most of what the film's state concerning them is fiction. Discoveries since then clearly invalidate what the film says: the Van Allen belts (actually somewhat more radiation-dense portions of the magnetosphere) are made up of sub-atomic particles trapped by the Earth's magnetic field in the vacuum of space and cannot catch fire, as fire requires oxygen, fuel, and an ignition source, all of which are insufficient in the Van Allen Belts. Unburned hydrocarbon emissions have never reached concentrations that could support a "sky fire".

At the beginning of the film, pieces of the polar ice cap are sinking, colliding with Seaview. No explanation is given as to why the ice doesn't float.

The submarine Seaview

The film's submarine design is unique in featuring an eight-window bow viewport that provides panoramic undersea views. In the novelization by Theodore Sturgeon, the windows are described as "oversized hull plates which happen to be transparent". They are made of "X-tempered herculite", a process developed by Nelson. In the film, Seaview has eight bow windows in the exterior shots, but only four appear in the interior shots showing the lower level Observation Room (the four upper windows are implied to be out of frame, at the top of the Observation Room). The lower hull also has an exterior shark-like bow flare, and the stern has 1961 Cadillac tail-fins. Seaview is propelled by a water-jet system generally similar to the magnetohydrodynamic system employed by the Red October in The Hunt for Red October, though no details are provided in the film.

In the film, the USOS Seaview (United States Oceanographic Survey) is under the authority of Nelson and the Bureau of Marine Exploration rather than the U.S. Navy. The novel mentions the bureau as being part of the U.S. Department of Science. The crew wears World War II U.S. Army tropical khaki dress uniforms with naval rank insignia on the sleeves, rather than U.S. Navy service dress khaki with shoulder boards. The officers' working uniforms are US Army khaki long with epaulets, black tie, and lapel insignia; however, unlike the U.S. Navy, the Marine Exploration insignia, a specialist insignia, is worn on the right collar point and rank insignia is worn on the left, the reverse of U.S. Navy practice. The crew's working uniform is the U.S. Navy period-correct chambray shirt and dungaree uniform, with the white "dixie cup" cap. Chief petty officers wear the Army khaki uniform with US Navy style chief's rank (less the Navy "crow" on top of the rocker) on both sleeves. The effect is that of government service, but not necessarily military service.

Production
The film was part of an upswing in science fiction and fantasy films of the era, including adaptations of Jules Verne's and H. G. Wells' works.

The film marked Walter Pidgeon's return to filmmaking after several years working in the theater. The role of Captain Crane was originally offered to David Hedison who played the role in the 1964 television series of the same name. Hedison turned the film down after completing Allen's The Lost World (1960) saying that he did not like the script.

Set designer Herman Blumenthal did not approach the Navy to do research; he relied solely on pictures of naval vessels in the media.

The theatrical release poster shown above is one of four posters that were produced to promote the film. Each one has different wording and slightly different artwork, and each one promotes the film from a different perspective. The above poster also promotes Sturgeon's novelization.

Reception
Voyage to the Bottom of the Sea was previewed on June 18, 1961. It was released to theaters in early July 1961 and had run its course by late fall (September/October). The film played to mixed reviews from critics, but audiences made the film a popular success. Voyage to the Bottom of the Sea was made for US$2 million and brought in US$7 million at the box office.

Impact
For the filming of Voyage to the Bottom of the Sea, detailed sets, props and scale models were created to realize the Seaview submarine. After the film was completed, the sets were placed in storage. When Irwin Allen decided to make a Voyage to the Bottom of the Sea television series, all he had to do was pull the sets out of storage. This was done at a fraction of the cost that he might have had if he had begun from scratch. The film reduced the cost of setting up the show and was the template for the type of stories that were done. The studios, having made the film, helped make the television series easier to produce.

Other media

Television
The success of the feature film led to the 1964–1968 ABC television series, Voyage to the Bottom of the Sea. During the series run, the film's storyline was remade as a one-hour episode, written by Willam Welch, and titled "The Sky's on Fire". Other scenes from the film were also rewritten and incorporated into the television series.

Novels 
In June 1961, Pyramid Books published a novelization of the film by science fiction writer Theodore Sturgeon. The book went on to be reprinted several times during the 1960s. One of those reprintings pictures Richard Basehart and David Hedison on the cover, but the book is still based on the Walter Pidgeon film. Collectors who want a novelization of the television series should find City Under the Sea. That novel uses the television characters, but should not be confused with either the television series or the later Irwin Allen film with the same name.

Sturgeon's book is based on an early version of the film's script and has the same basic story as the film. It also has a few characters that were not in the film, as well as some additional technical explanation. Some film scenes are different, while some others are wholly absent from the film. Likewise, some film scenes are missing from the book.

The original 1961 book cover portrays a submarine meeting a fanged sea serpent. This scene is not in the novel or the film. The submarine design on the cover does not match the Seaview shown in the film or the Seaview described in the novel: The submarine's bow is opaque, and her "Observation Room" is a rearward projection from the base of the conning tower. The basic shape of the Seaview'''s hull resembles that of the U.S. Navy's , the first American nuclear-powered submarine with an "Albacore hull", including its cruciform stern and single-screw propeller.

Comics
A submarine design very similar to the one used on the 1961 book cover shows up in the 1962 Dell Comics series, Voyage to the Deep (with a similar mission to save the world), that was published to capitalize on the film's popularity. The submarine's mission took it to the Mariana Trench to stop the Earth from wobbling out of orbit. Dell later cancelled the title with issue #4. The submarine was named Proteus, later the name of the submersible seen in the science fiction film Fantastic Voyage (1966).

In 1961, Dell Comics created a full-color adaptation of the Voyage to the Bottom of the Sea film. The comic book was Four Color Comics #1230 and was illustrated by Sam Glanzman. It contains a few publicity stills from the film, plus a section on the history of submarines. In this adaptation, the Admiral's first name is Farragut instead of Harriman.Mad magazine published a TV series parody entitled, "Voyage to See What's on the Bottom".

Other
There is also a family board game, manufactured by GemColor, that is tied to the film and not the television series. The game's product carton uses a photo of a wetsuited scuba diver with the eight-foot shooting miniature of the Seaview.

A Voyage to the Bottom of the Sea coloring book for children was released in the mid-1960s.

The film has since been released in multiple territories on VHS, DVD, and Blu-ray.

See also
 List of maritime science fiction works

 References 

Other sources
 Tim Colliver, Seaview: The Making of Voyage to the Bottom of the Sea, 1992, Alpha Control press.
 Voyage to the Bottom of the Sea'' (VHS)

External links 
 
 
 
 
 
 
 
 Mike's Voyage to the Bottom of the Sea Zone – the movie.

1961 films
1960s English-language films
1960s science fiction films
1960s disaster films
1960s adventure drama films
American disaster films
American science fiction films
Apocalyptic films
Films directed by Irwin Allen
20th Century Fox films
CinemaScope films
Sea adventure films
Science fiction submarine films
Films produced by Irwin Allen
Films adapted into television shows
Films adapted into comics
Films set in the Arctic
1961 drama films
Films scored by Paul Sawtell
1960s American films